Paramasivum Pillay "Barlen" Vyapoory (born 1945/46) is a Mauritian politician and diplomat who served as the fifth vice president of Mauritius from April 2016 to November 2019.

Early life 
Barlen Vyapoory previously served as High Commissioner of the Republic of Mauritius to South Africa. Vyapoory has served as president of that organization on several occasions. He is a member of the Militant Socialist Movement.

After Ameenah Gurib stepped down, he served as the acting president of Mauritius until his resignation on 26 November 2019.

Awards and decorations
:
 Grand Officer of the Most Distinguished Order of the Star and Key of the Indian Ocean

References

Living people
Presidents of Mauritius
Vice-presidents of Mauritius
Mauritian people of Tamil descent
Militant Socialist Movement politicians
1940s births
Mauritian people of Indian descent
Place of birth missing (living people)
Mauritian politicians of Indian descent
Mauritian Tamil politicians
Grand Officers of the Order of the Star and Key of the Indian Ocean